Leigh Donovan (born December 11, 1971 in Orange, California) is an American former professional downhill mountain bike racer and current cycling ambassador and women's mountain bike clinic instructor.

Cycling career
Donovan was a champion mountain bike racer, competing from 1993 to 2001, the most decorated U.S. downhill and slalom rider. She retired from her professional career in 2001, with the world championships in Vail, Co. as her final pro career event (where she placed 3rd in the final downhill). Donovan went into sports marketing with Hansens energy drink (at the ground level of what would become Monster Energy). She then went on to own and operate a very successful clothing boutique in Temecula, Ca. from 2003 until she departed the retail fashion business in March 2011.

In 2010, at 38 years of age, a mother of a 5 year old, retail business owner (Tangerine boutique in Temecula, Ca.) and 9 years after retiring from professional racing, Donovan decided to try to make the U.S. National Downhill team. She competed at a few qualifier events and took 4th place at the USA CYCLING National Championships, qualifying her for the UCI World Championships at Mont St. Anne Quebec Canada. Leigh finished 8th place in the finals, was the highest placed American and oldest competitor in the race, Donovan and her daughter carried the flag out at the opening ceremonies. Leigh and her daughter Grace carry the U.S. Flag at opening ceremonies

Donovan married in 2000 and had one daughter in 2005. She has been a long time women's mountain bike coach and instructor for women of all backgrounds and skill levels, promoting and hosting her own women's only events over the last 15 years. In 2014 Leigh launched a coaching and clinic business called iChooseBikes that put the focus on teaching MTB skills to riders of all ages, levels, and genders; Leigh believes that if you can master the foundational skills, that you can shred much longer avoiding injuries. 

In January 2022, Leigh Donovan took a full time role with SRAM_Corporation as the Southern California Field Guide; representing the brand through local bicycle dealers, focused on the aftermarket segment of the bike industry as well as empowering cyclists through advocacy and event support; including youth racing.

Career highlights
• 2020 USA Bicycling Hall of fame inductee 

• 2013 BMX Hall of fame inductee 

• 2014 MTB Hall of fame inductee 

• Only female in both MTB and BMX Hall of fame 

• 39 UCI World Cup Podiums

• 9-time U.S. NORBA National Champion

• 1995 UCI Mountain Bike World Championships- Downhill World Champion

• 1996 UCI Mountain Bike World Championships- 2nd place

• 2001 UCI Mountain Bike World Championships- 3rd place 

• 2001 UCI World Cup Dual Champion

• 3 time UCI World Championship medalist

• 1989 USA BMX National Cruiser Champion 

• In the 25 years of the official UCI World Downhill Championships, Leigh is 1 of only 3 American women to have won the title, and the LAST American Female to be crowned.

External links
Official Website of Leigh Donovan
SRAM LLC

1971 births
Living people
Sportspeople from Orange, California
American female cyclists
Downhill mountain bikers
UCI Mountain Bike World Champions (women)
American mountain bikers
21st-century American women